Michael Alan Gottlieb (born November 15, 1968) is an American politician serving as a Democratic member of the Florida House of Representatives, representing the State's 98th House district.

Career
Gottlieb was elected to the Florida House of Representatives in November 2018 . He secured sixty-four percent of the vote, while Republican rival, Joseph Cruz, secured thirty-six percent.

References

Gottlieb, Michael
Living people
21st-century American politicians
1968 births
Jewish American state legislators in Florida
People from Davie, Florida
21st-century American Jews